Neosho County Community College (NCCC) is a public community college in Chanute, Kansas. It has a secondary campus in Ottawa, Kansas. It is accredited by the Higher Learning Commission.

History
In 1936, it was established as Chanute Junior College. On July 1, 1965, it was renamed to Neosho County Community Junior College.

Campuses
The Chanute Campus of NCCC allows students to live on campus and have a dinner plan. This campus is more designed for full-time traditional students. It is also the larger of the two campuses.

The Ottawa campus is different from Chanute campus in that the former has no housing available. This campus is more designed for part-time nontraditional students, though significant numbers of traditional students also attend this campus. Students at Ottawa High School are offered numerous dual-credit college courses through this campus.

Athletics

Notable alumni
 Edwin Bideau, lawyer and politician
 David Bote, professional baseball player
 Olga Fedori, actress
 Matt Strahm, professional baseball player
 Patrick Williams – professional MMA fighter for the UFC
 Andy Young, professional baseball player

References

External links
 

Two-year colleges in the United States
Education in Neosho County, Kansas
Education in Franklin County, Kansas
Buildings and structures in Neosho County, Kansas
Community colleges in Kansas
NJCAA athletics
Educational institutions established in 1936
1936 establishments in Kansas